Het Beest (The Beast) is a 1982 Belgian/Dutch film, made by Flemish writer/director Paul Collet and starring Willem Ruis. For Ruis, who was at the height of his career as a showman and presenter on Dutch television, it was his first and last appearance in cinema. The movie was a flop.

Background and production

The film was written and directed by Paul Collet. It was shot in 1981, and released in April 1982. Willem Ruis, presenter of various quiz shows and a very popular variety program, stars as Harry Melchior. He had just moved from the KRO to the VARA, trading in his Willem Ruis Show for the Willem Ruis Lottoshow. He was paid a salary unheard of at the time (Hfl 300,000 per year, high enough to lead to questions in parliament) but explained that his career in television was not going to last forever, and his side step to cinema was a career plan for the long-term. Some extra scenes were shot for the Dutch release.

Plot
Harry Melchior (Ruis) works for an investment firm and lives a privileged life with his family until he discovers that for one of his deals his mother's house will have to be torn down. Unable to stop the project he occupies the house illegally and is sentenced to prison, losing his job. His mother (the performance by Cara van Wersch was praised by one critic) is forced to move into a nursing home and dies shortly thereafter, sending Melchior into a rage. Hiding out in the forest "like a Dutch Rambo," he ambushes his former colleagues while they are fox hunting, and shoots them with a machine gun. After a meeting with his former boss's mistress he surrenders to police.

Reception
The film was a "legendary flop." Its script was deemed disjointed, and the violence excessive. The response from film was negative, and it was pulled from movie theaters very quickly.

Cast
 Willem Ruis – Harry Melchior
 Hedie Meyling – Lenie Melchior
 Anouk Collet – Bibi Melchior
 Cara van Wersch – mother
 Ward de Ravet – Karlsen
 Josée Ruiter – Martine
 Bert André – investigative judge
 Freya Ligtenberg – Eveline
 Alex van Haecke – audience member
 Wim Langeraert – commando
 Pol Goossen – police inspector
 Harry Kümel – man on interstate
 Ivo Pauwels – Charles
 Filip van Flem – Harry (age 6)
 Elise Nabar – girl in casino
 Marpessa Henninck – girl in casino
 Emanuela van Laar – girl in casino
 Akkemay Elderenbos

References

External links

1982 films
Belgian drama films
Dutch drama films